Tranmere Rovers F.C. played the 1930–31 season in the Football League Third Division North. It was their tenth season of league football, and they finished 4th of 22 teams. They reached the First Round of the FA Cup.

Football League

References 

Tranmere Rovers F.C. seasons